TrailsforYouth.Org the organization was founded in 2003 operating three chapters of the trips for kids program and changed their name to TrailsforYouth.Org. They have served thousands of youth in the DC for the past 15 years, providing them safe, fun, physical activity and mentoring in a natural setting. Currently their main focus is on low income families and at-risk youth in the Northern Virginia community of Springfield. For example, the organization takes kids into Lake Accotink Park in Fairfax, VA, where mountain bikes are provided for exercise and fun. Since its inception, the organization has provided over 10,000 opportunities for adventure.

In 2012 TrailsforYouth.Org celebrated their 10th year as an award-winning children's health organization.

In 2015, Diamondback Bicycles partnered with the organization in a multi-year agreement to provide new equipment to replace the aging equipment used by the organization.

References

External links
external link to trailsforyouth.org's website

Outdoor recreation organizations
Child-related organizations in the United States
Non-profit organizations based in Washington, D.C.